Parabens are a class of widely used preservatives in cosmetic and pharmaceutical products.  Chemically, they are a series of parahydroxybenzoates or esters of parahydroxybenzoic acid (also known as 4-hydroxybenzoic acid). Parabens are effective preservatives in many types of formulas. These compounds, and their salts, are used primarily for their bactericidal and fungicidal properties. They are found in shampoos, commercial moisturizers, shaving gels, personal lubricants, topical/parenteral pharmaceuticals, suntan products, makeup, and toothpaste. They are also used as food preservatives.

Certain parabens have been linked to cancer.

Mode of action
Parabens are active against a broad spectrum of microorganisms. However, their antibacterial mode of action is not well understood. They are thought to act by disrupting membrane transport processes or by inhibiting synthesis of DNA and RNA or of some key enzymes, such as ATPases and phosphotransferases, in some bacterial species. Propylparaben is considered more active against more bacteria than methylparaben. 
The stronger antibacterial action of propylparaben may be due to its greater solubility in the bacterial membrane, which may allow it to reach cytoplasmic targets in greater concentrations. However, since a majority of the studies on the mechanism of action of parabens suggest that their antibacterial action is linked to the membrane, it is possible that its greater lipid solubility disrupts the lipid bilayer, thereby interfering with bacterial membrane transport processes and perhaps causing the leakage of intracellular constituents.

Chemistry
Parabens are esters of para-hydroxybenzoic acid, from which the name is derived. Common parabens include methylparaben (E number E218), ethylparaben (E214), propylparaben (E216), butylparaben and heptylparaben (E209). Less common parabens include isobutylparaben, isopropylparaben, benzylparaben and their sodium salts. The general chemical structure of a paraben is shown at the top right of this page, where R symbolizes an alkyl group such as methyl, ethyl, propyl or butyl.

Synthesis
All commercially used parabens are synthetically produced, although some are identical to those found in nature. They are produced by the esterification of para-hydroxybenzoic acid with the appropriate alcohol, such as methanol, ethanol, or n-propanol. para-Hydroxybenzoic acid is in turn produced industrially from a modification of the Kolbe-Schmitt reaction, using potassium phenoxide and carbon dioxide.

Health considerations 
Most of the available paraben toxicity data are from single-exposure studies, meaning one type of paraben in one type of product.  According to paraben research this is relatively safe, posing only a negligible risk to the endocrine system. However, since many types of parabens in many types of products are used commonly, further assessment of the additive and cumulative risk of multiple paraben exposure from daily use of multiple cosmetic and/or personal care products is needed.  FDA states that they have no information that use of parabens in cosmetics has any effect on health.  They continue to consider certain questions and evaluate data about parabens' possible health effects.

Allergic reactions
Parabens are, for the most part, non-irritating and non-sensitizing. Among people with contact dermatitis or eczema, less than 3% of patients were found to have a sensitivity to parabens. At least one case has been reported of an allergic reaction to parabens.

Breast cancer 
The American Cancer Society mentioned a 2004 study that found parabens in the breast tissue of mastectomy patients but did not find parabens to be a cause of the cancers.  Michael Thun of ACS stated that the effects of parabens would be minuscule compared to other risks "such as taking hormones after menopause and being overweight". A 2005 review concluded "it is biologically implausible that parabens could increase the risk of any estrogen-mediated endpoint, including effects on the male reproductive tract or breast cancer" and that "worst-case daily exposure to parabens would present substantially less risk relative to exposure to naturally occurring endocrine active chemicals in the diet such as the phytoestrogen daidzein."

Estrogenic activity
Animal experiments have shown that parabens have weak estrogenic activity, acting as xenoestrogens.  In an in vivo study, the effect of butylparaben was determined to be about 1/100,000th that of estradiol, and was observed only at a dose level around 25,000 times higher than the level typically used to preserve products. The study also found that the in vivo estrogenic activity of parabens is reduced by about three orders of magnitude compared to in vitro activity.

The estrogenic activity of parabens increases with the length of the alkyl group. It is believed that propylparaben is estrogenic to a certain degree as well, though this is expected to be less than butylparaben by virtue of its less lipophilic nature. Since it can be concluded that the estrogenic activity of butylparaben is negligible under normal use, the same should be concluded for shorter analogs due to estrogenic activity of parabens increasing with the length of the alkyl group.

Birth Size 
Higher concentrations of n-butylparaben found in the urine of second trimester pregnant women were shown to be correlated with smaller birth sizes of female offspring. This relationship was not found in male offspring. Other parabens such as methylparaben, ethylparaben, iso-propylparaben, n-propylparaben, and benzylparaben were analyzed in this study as well, but the correlation was only found to be present with increased concentrations of n-butylparaben.

Controversy
Concerns about endocrine disruptors have led consumers and companies to search for paraben-free alternatives. A common alternative has been phenoxyethanol, but this has its own risks and has led to an FDA warning on inclusion in nipple creams.

Regulation
The European Scientific Committee on Consumer Safety (SCCS) reiterated in 2013 that methylparaben and ethylparaben are safe at the maximum authorized concentrations (up to 0.4% for one ester or 0.8% when used in combination).  The SCCS concluded that the use of butylparaben and propylparaben as preservatives in finished cosmetic products is safe to the consumer, as long as the sum of their individual concentrations does not exceed 0.19%. Isopropylparaben, isobutylparaben, phenylparaben, benzylparaben and pentylparaben were banned by European Commission Regulation (EU) No 358/2014.

Environmental considerations

Release into the environment

Paraben discharge into the environment is common due to its ubiquitous use in cosmetic products. A 2010 study on consumer available personal care products revealed that 44% of the tested products contain parabens. When washing these products off the human body, they flow down the drain and into community wastewater. Once this occurs, the potential for parabens to accumulate within aqueous and solid mediums materializes. Some of the most common paraben derivatives found in the environment include methylparaben, ethylparaben, propylparaben, and butylparaben. Parabens flow in wastewater to wastewater treatment plants (WWTP) as influent, where they are either removed, chemically altered, or released into the environment through sludge or tertiary effluent.

In one New York wastewater treatment plant (WWTP), mass load of all parent paraben derivatives (methylparaben, ethylparaben, propylparaben, butylparaben, etc.) from influent wastewater was found to be 176 mg/day/1000 people. When this value is used to estimate the amount of parabens entering WWTPs from the 8.5 million people currently residing in New York City for an entire year, a value of approximately 546 kg of parabens is calculated. Therefore, levels of paraben accumulation prove significant upon long-term observance. WWTPs eliminate between 92–98% of paraben derivatives; however, much of this removal is due to the formation of degradation products. Despite their reputed high elimination through WWTPs, various studies have measured high levels of paraben derivatives and degradation products persisting in the environment.

Formation of degradation products

Chlorinated products

In addition to parent parabens, paraben degradation products that form throughout WWTP stages present a concern to the environment, including mono- and di- chlorinated parabens. When paraben-containing products are washed down the drain, parabens have the potential to undergo chlorination reactions. This reaction can occur with free chlorine present in tap water or with sodium hypochlorite, which is often used in WWTPs as a final disinfectant step. In neutral water, Raman spectroscopy has confirmed that chlorine is predominantly present as hypochlorous acid (HClO). Parabens can react with HClO to form mono- and di- chlorinated products through electrophilic aromatic substitution. The electrophilic attack of the chlorine forms a carbocation that is stabilized by donated electron density from the hydroxyl group of the paraben. This step is endergonic due to the loss of aromaticity, though the hydroxyl group acts as an activating group that increases the rate. A base can then abstract a proton from the carbon containing the chlorine, which is followed by subsequent restoration of aromaticity by the involved pi electrons. Since the hydroxyl group is more activating than the ester group of the paraben, the reaction will direct in both ortho positions, as the para position is already blocked.

The Arrhenius equation was used in a study to calculate activation energies for the chlorination of four parent parabens (methyl-, ethyl-, propyl-, and butylparaben) and was found to range from 36–47kJ/mol. In another study, tap water at  containing 50–200μM free chlorine was spiked with 0.5μM propylparaben and the composition of the mixture was monitored over 40 minutes to determine if chlorination occurs under conditions found in tap water. Results from the study confirm the disappearance of propylparaben after 5 minutes, the appearance of both 3-chloro-propylparaben and 3,5-dichloro-propylparaben paraben by 5 minutes, and the persistence of 3,5-dichloro-propylparaben as the main species remaining in the reaction.  A similar, though more rapid, trend was found in a study in which the reaction temperature was increased to 35°C.

4-Hydroxybenzoic acid (PHBA)

Another significant paraben degradation product is 4-hydroxybenzoic acid (PHBA). There are two mechanisms in which parabens can degrade to PHBA. The first degradation route occurs chemically. Parent parabens readily undergo base-catalyzed hydrolysis of the ester bond, forming PHBA. The reaction occurs under moderately alkaline conditions, specifically when the pH is ≥ 8. This reaction is quite prevalent in household environments due to the pH range of household wastewater being 6–9 and the prevalent existence of parabens in cosmetic products. When paraben-containing cosmetic products are discharged into community wastewater influent, they become exposed to an environment where the pH ≥ 8, and the base-catalyzed hydrolysis of the parent paraben ensues, forming PHBA.

In the electron transfer mechanism, the pi electrons in the double bond between the oxygen and carbonyl carbon resonate to the oxygen, leaving a negative charge on the oxygen and a positive charge on the carbonyl carbon. A hydroxide ion, acting as a nucleophile, attacks the now electrophilic carbonyl carbon, yielding sp3 hybridization on the carbonyl carbon. The electrons resonate back to form the double bond between the oxygen and the carbonyl carbon. In order to retain the original sp2 hybridization, the –OR group will leave. The –OR group acts as a better leaving group than the –OH group due to its ability to maintain a negative charge with greater stability. Lastly, the –OR-, acting as a base, will deprotonate the carboxylic acid to form a carboxylate anion. 
 
The second way in which parabens can degrade into PHBA occurs biologically within WWTPs. During the secondary clarifier phase of Wastewater treatment, sludge accumulates at the bottom of the secondary clarifier. Upon separation of the liquid and solid phases of the incoming influent, parabens have a greater tendency accumulate in the sludge. This is due to its moderate hydrophobicity, as quantified by a log Kow value of approximately  1.58. This sludge is concentrated in organic nutrients; consequently, a proliferation of microorganisms becomes common within the sludge. One organism is Enterobacter cloacae, which biologically metabolizes the sludge parabens into PHBA.

Accumulation of degradation products in the environment

Through various analytical techniques such as gas chromatography and high-performance liquid chromatography, the exact levels of accumulation of paraben derivatives and degradation products in the environment have been quantified. These levels have been accurately measured in tertiary effluent and sewage sludge, as these are the primary avenues for which parabens and their degradation products reach the environment upon discharge from WWTPs.

Paraben stability in sewage sludge is relatively high due to their ability to bind with organic matter. Soil adsorption coefficient values were calculated by the U.S. Environmental Protection Agency as 1.94 (methylparaben), 2.20 (ethylparaben), 2.46 (propylparaben), and 2.72 (butylparaben), all of which suggest that parabens have the ability to adhere to the organic portion of sediment and sludge, and thus, persist environmentally.

Chlorinated parabens are removed from WWTPs with only 40% efficiency in comparison to 92–98% efficiency of parent parabens. The decrease in removal efficiency can be attributed to the decreased biodegradability of chlorinated parabens, their increased overall stability throughout WWTPs, and their relatively low sorption to the sludge phase due to low log Kow values.

Higher levels of PHBA are found in tertiary effluent in comparison to paraben derivatives, and PHBA exists in the highest concentration in sewage sludge. There are two reasons for these levels of accumulation. The first reason is PHBA's tendency to sorb to solid particles, which can be approximated by benzoic acid's high Kd value of approximately 19. The pKa of PHBA is 2.7, but it is in an environment of a pH between 6–9. Since the pKa is less than the pH, the carboxylic acid will be deprotonated. The carboxylate allows it to act as a sorbent on solid environmental matrices, thus promoting its aggregation in tertiary effluent, but especially sewage sludge, which acts as the solid matrix itself. The second reason is due to the intermediate increase in levels of PHBA during the secondary clarifier phase of the WWTP through biological processes.

Environmental concerns with paraben degradation products
Multiple studies have linked chlorinated parabens to endocrine disrupting functions, specifically mimicking the effects of estrogen, and chlorinated parabens are believed to be 3–4 times more toxic than their parent paraben. In Daphnia magna, general toxicity conferred by chlorinated parabens occurs through non-specific disruption of cell membrane function. The potency of the chlorinated parabens correlates with the propensity of the compound to accumulate in cell membranes. Thus, chlorinated parabens generally increase in toxicity as their ester chains increase in length due to their increased hydrophobicity.

The implications of PHBA's environmental accumulation also warrants attention. If the tertiary effluent is re-used for community use as greywater, it poses  a hazard to humans. These hazards include, but are not limited to, abnormal fetal development, endocrine disrupting activity, and improper estrogen-promoting effects. If the tertiary effluent is released to the environment in rivers and streams or if the sludge is used as fertilizer, it poses as a hazard to environmental organisms. It is especially toxic to those organisms on lower trophic levels, particularly various algal species. In fact, it has been shown that the LC  for a specific algal species, Selenastrum capricornutum, is 0.032 micrograms per litre (μg/L). This is less than the natural abundance of PHBA in tertiary effluent at a level of 0.045μg/L, thus indicating that current levels of PHBA in tertiary effluent can potentially eradicate more than 50% of Selenastrum capricornutum it comes in contact with.

Removal of parabens through ozonation 

Ozonation is an advanced treatment technique that has been considered as a possible method to limit the amount of parabens, chlorinated parabens, and PHBA that are accumulating in the environment. Ozone is an extremely powerful oxidant that oxidizes parabens and makes them easier to remove once subsequently passed through a filter. Due to the electrophilic nature of ozone, it can easily react with the aromatic paraben ring to form hydroxylated products. Ozonation is generally regarded as a less dangerous method of disinfection than chlorination, though ozonation requires more cost considerations. Ozonation has demonstrated great efficacy in the removal of parabens (98.8–100%) and a slightly lower efficacy of 92.4% for PHBA. A moderately lower rate of removal, however, is observed for chlorinated parabens (59.2–82.8%). A proposed reaction mechanism for the removal of parabens by ozonation is detailed mechanistically.

References